Victoria Vivians (born November 17, 1994, in Jackson, Mississippi) is an American professional basketball player for the Indiana Fever of the Women's National Basketball Association (WNBA). She played college basketball for the Mississippi State Bulldogs. She helped lead the Bulldogs to four appearances in the NCAA tournament, including three Sweet Sixteens, and two appearances in the championship game in 2017 and 2018. Vivians was chosen eighth overall by the Indiana Fever in the 2018 WNBA draft on April 12, 2018.

Personal life
Vivians is the daughter of John and Angela Vivians and Deborah Peatry. She graduated from Scott Central High School. She also graduated from Mississippi State University, majoring in Human Development and Family Science. She represented the Bulldogs as a guard in basketball.

WNBA career statistics

Regular season

|-
| style='text-align:left;'|2018
| style='text-align:left;'|Indiana
| 34 || 26 || 27.1 || .404 || .399 || .931 || 3.1 || 1.2 || 0.9 || 0.1 || 1.0 || 8.9
|-
| style='text-align:left;'|2020
| style='text-align:left;'|Indiana
| 6 || 0 || 14.2 || .345 || .182 || .875 || 2.3 || 0.5 || 0.2 || 0.0 || 1.0 || 4.8
|-
| style='text-align:left;'|2021
| style='text-align:left;'|Indiana
| 31 || 8 || 21.3 || .333 || .252 || .833 || 3.1 || 1.3 || 1.1 || 0.1 || 1.3 || 6.8
|-
| style='text-align:left;'|2022
| style='text-align:left;'|Indiana
| 35 || 30 || 26.9 || .336 || .280 || .742 || 3.6 || 2.4 || 1.1 || 0.3 || 2.1 || 9.8
|-
| style='text-align:left;'| Career
| style='text-align:left;'| 4 years, 1 team
| 106 || 64 || 24.6 || .355 || .312 || .814 || 3.2 || 1.6 || 1.0 || 0.2 || 1.4 || 8.3

Collegiate career

Mississippi State statistics
Source:

References

External links
Mississippi State Bulldogs bio

1994 births
Living people
All-American college women's basketball players
American women's basketball players
Basketball players from Mississippi
Indiana Fever draft picks
Indiana Fever players
LGBT basketball players
LGBT people from Mississippi
Lesbian sportswomen
Mississippi State Bulldogs women's basketball players
Parade High School All-Americans (girls' basketball)
People from Forest, Mississippi
Shooting guards